Air Chief Marshal Sir John Wakeling Baker,  (23 October 1897 – 10 March 1978) was a senior commander in the Royal Air Force in the mid-20th century.

Flying career
Baker was commissioned into the Royal Garrison Artillery in February 1916. He transferred to the Royal Flying Corps later that year initially as a Gunnery Liaison Officer.

In 1918 he was awarded the Military Cross, the citation for which was promulgated in The London Gazette on 26 July 1918, reading:

He was appointed a Flight Commander in No. 60 Squadron in January 1924 during Pink's War in Waziristan. He was awarded the Distinguished Flying Cross in 1925, with the citation praising his: "gallant and distinguished service with the Royal Air Force in Waziristan. This officer showed devotion to duty throughout the operations and set a high example to all ranks. He performed 69 hours war flying as a pilot, which included 35 raids."

Baker was appointed Officer Commanding No. 33 Squadron in 1935 and then joined the Directing Staff at the RAF Staff College in 1939. He served in the Second World War, initially as Deputy Director of Plans at the Air Ministry and then as Director of Bomber Operations from February 1941. He continued his war service as Senior Air Staff Officer first at Headquarters, Air Forces in India and then at South East Asia Command. He finished the war as Air Officer Commanding No. 12 Group.

After the war, Baker became Director-General of Personnel in 1946, Air Officer Commanding-in-Chief at Coastal Command in 1948 and Commander-in-Chief RAF Middle East Air Force in 1950. Baker's last appointments were as Deputy Chief of the Air Staff in March 1952, Vice-Chief of the Air Staff in November 1952 and Controller of Aircraft at the Ministry of Supply before he retired in 1956.

References

|-

|-

|-

|-

 

Royal Air Force air marshals
1897 births
1978 deaths
Canadian military personnel from Manitoba
Knights Grand Cross of the Order of the British Empire
Knights Commander of the Order of the Bath
Recipients of the Military Cross
Recipients of the Distinguished Flying Cross (United Kingdom)
Royal Flying Corps officers
Royal Garrison Artillery officers
British Army personnel of World War I
People from Winnipeg